Marion County Airport , also known as Brown Field, is a county-owned, public-use airport located four nautical miles (7 km) southeast of the central business district of Jasper, a town in Marion County, Tennessee, United States.

Facilities and aircraft 
It has one runway designated 4/22 with an asphalt surface measuring 3,500 by 75 feet (1,067 x 23 m).

For the 12-month period ending June 25, 2009, the airport had 4,480 aircraft operations, an average of 12 per day: 98% general aviation and 2% military. At that time there were 12 aircraft based at this airport: 92% single-engine and 8% helicopter.

References

External links 
 Aerial photo as of 19 May 2012 
 Aerial photo as of 21 March 1997 from USGS The National Map
 
 

Airports in Tennessee
Buildings and structures in Marion County, Tennessee
Transportation in Marion County, Tennessee